Mahmudul Hasan (born 1990) is a Bangladeshi cricketer.

Mahmudul Hasan may also refer to:

Mahmud Hasan Deobandi (1851–1920), Indian Muslim scholar
Mahmood Hasan Gangohi (1907–1996), Indian Muslim scholar
Mahmudul Hasan (general), Bangladeshi politician and retired military officer
Mahmudul Hasan (scholar) (born 1950), Bangladeshi Deobandi Islamic Scholar
Mahmud al-Hasani al-Sarkhi (born 1964), Iraqi Shia cleric
Mahmudul Hasan (Victoria Sporting Club cricketer) (born 1994), Bangladeshi cricketer

Human name disambiguation pages